George W. Owings III (born April 11, 1945) is an American politician. He has served as the Secretary of the Maryland Department of Veterans Affairs since January 22, 2015. He previously served as the Secretary of the Maryland Department of Veterans Affairs from 2004 to 2007. Owings previously served as a member of the Maryland House of Delegates in District 29A and  District 27B from 1988 to 2004.

Early life
George W. Owings III was born on April 11, 1945, in Daytona Beach, Florida. He attended Calvert High School in Prince Frederick, Maryland. Owings attended the University of Maryland from 1963 to 1964. He graduated from Prince George's Community College in 1978 with an Associate of Arts in liberal arts.

Career
Owings served in the United States Marine Corps from 1964 to 1968, serving in the Vietnam War and reaching the rank of sergeant. He received a Presidential Unit Citation, Navy Unit Commendation with Bronze Star Device, Navy and Marine Corps Medal and the Vietnam Service Medal with Silver Star Device.

Owings worked as a mortgage banker. He served as member of the Maryland House of Delegates from 1988 to 2004. He represented District 29A from 1988 to 1994 and District 27B from 1995 to 2004. Owings was appointed as Maryland Secretary of Veterans Affairs on June 1, 2004 by Governor Bob Ehrlich. He remained in that role until January 17, 2007. He then served as acting secretary until May 9, 2007.

Owings became the acting Maryland Secretary of Veterans Affairs on January 22, 2015. He then was appointed as Secretary of Veteran Affairs by Governor Larry Hogan on February 13, 2015. He currently serves in this role.

References

Living people
1945 births
People from Daytona Beach, Florida
Military personnel from Florida
Democratic Party members of the Maryland House of Delegates
Recipients of the Navy and Marine Corps Medal
United States Marine Corps personnel of the Vietnam War
State cabinet secretaries of Maryland
20th-century American politicians
21st-century American politicians